Andrew Langford (born 31 August 1967) is an Australian former professional rugby league footballer who played during the 1980s and 1990s. He played his entire club football career with the Parramatta Eels. His position of choice was

Playing career
Langford was graded by the Parramatta Eels in the 1988 season, he made his first grade debut at second-row in his side's 22−20 victory over arch rivals the Manly Sea Eagles at Parramatta Stadium in round 1 of the 1989 season. Langford made 12 appearances for the Eels in his debut season, with seven of those being in the starting side.

In the 1990 season, Langford played all of his 13 games for the season in the starting side. Langford's only try in his first grade career came in his side's 20−14 loss to the Penrith Panthers in round 12 of the 1991 season.

After not making a single first grade appearance in the 1992 season, Langford's final season in first grade came in the 1993 season, in which he made only two appearances. His final appearance in first grade came from the bench in his side's 36−4 loss to the St. George Dragons at Jubilee Oval in round 19 of the 1993 season. He was released by the Eels at season's end and subsequently retired from playing. He finished his career playing 40 games, and scoring one try.

Post playing
Following his retirement from rugby league, Langford completed a degree in physiotherapy. He currently works as a leading sports physiotherapist. The opportunity to work with elite athletes has further fueled his passion for helping athletes get back to their sports in the best possible condition. Langford is focused on his clients and enjoys helping them achieve their goals recovering from injury.

References

1967 births
Living people
Australian rugby league players
Australian sports physicians
Rugby league players from Sydney
Sportsmen from New South Wales
Parramatta Eels players
Sports physiotherapists
Rugby league second-rows